Heritage Hill Historic District may refer to:

Heritage Hill Historic District (Burlington, Iowa), listed on the National Register of Historic Places in Des Moines County, Iowa
Heritage Hill Historic District (Grand Rapids, Michigan), listed on the National Register of Historic Places in Kent County, Michigan